Byron D. Brown (August 4, 1854 – October 4, 1929) was an American glove manufacturer and politician from New York.

Life 
Brown was born on August 4, 1854 in Broadalbin, New York, the son of Isaac Brown, a paper manufacturer, and Laura M. Smith. He grew up on the family farm, and moved to Mayfield in 1876. In 1881, he began manufacturing gloves, and owned a large factory near the village of Mayfield. He also owned the village drug store.

Brown served as town clerk, justice of the peace, and town supervisor. In 1895, he was elected to the New York State Assembly as a Republican, representing Fulton and Hamilton Counties. He served in the Assembly in 1896 and 1897. After his term expired, he was named collector for Internal Revenue. In 1917, he became Commissioner of Jurors of Fulton County. He held this office when he died.

In 1884, Brown married Elizabeth A. Griffis of Gloversville. They had no children. He was a member of the Freemasons, the Royal Arch Masonry, and the Odd Fellows. He was a member of the Mayfield Presbyterian church.

Brown died at home on October 4, 1929, less than a month after his wife's death. He was buried in the family plot in the Mayfield cemetery.

References

External links 

 The Political Graveyard
 Byron D. Brown at Find a Grave

1854 births
1929 deaths
People from Broadalbin, New York
People from Fulton County, New York
American industrialists
Businesspeople from New York (state)
19th-century American businesspeople
American justices of the peace
Town supervisors in New York (state)
19th-century American politicians
Republican Party members of the New York State Assembly
American Freemasons
Presbyterians from New York (state)
Burials in New York (state)